Mayans M.C. (also known simply as Mayans) is an American crime drama television series created by Kurt Sutter and Elgin James, that premiered on September 4, 2018, on FX. The show takes place in the same fictional universe as Sons of Anarchy and deals with the Sons' rivals-turned-allies, the Mayans Motorcycle Club.

The series's fourth season premiered on April 19, 2022. In July 2022, the series was renewed for a fifth season, which will serve as the series' final.

Premise
Mayans M.C. takes place two-and-a-half years after the events of Sons of Anarchy and is set hundreds of miles away in the fictional California border town of Santo Padre. The series focuses on the struggles of Ezekiel "EZ" Reyes, a prospect in the charter of the Mayans M.C. based on the U.S.–Mexico border. EZ is the gifted son of a proud Mexican family, whose American dream was snuffed out by cartel violence. Now, his need for vengeance drives him toward a life he never intended and can never escape.

Cast and characters

Main
 J. D. Pardo as Ezekiel "EZ" Reyes, a former prospect and later the former Vice Presidente and current Presidente of the Mayans M.C., Santo Padre Charter, who joined the club following his release from prison. He is the younger brother of fellow club member Angel Reyes, who sponsored him during his time as a prospect, and is the son of Felipe and Marisol Reyes. He later starts a relationship with Gaby Castillo which ends when she leaves Santo Padre and later starts a new relationship with Sofia.
 Clayton Cardenas as Angel Reyes, a full patch member and later El Secretario (Secretary) of the Mayans M.C., Santo Padre Charter. He is the older brother of EZ and the son of Felipe and Marisol. He later starts a relationship with Adelita and is the father of their child, Maverick.
 Sarah Bolger as Emily Galindo (née Thomas), EZ's former childhood sweetheart, now the wife of Miguel Galindo and the mother of their son, Cristóbal Galindo II, who is named after Miguel's deceased brother. She is also the older sister of Erin Thomas.
 Michael Irby as Obispo "Bishop" Losa, the former Presidente and current Vice Presidente of the Mayans M.C., Santo Padre Charter. He is one of the three Kings of the Mayans M.C. and cousins with its founder Marcus Alvarez. He had a young son with Antonia Pena, Aidan Losa, who died in a car accident that continues to haunt him.
 Carla Baratta as Luisa "Adelita" Espina, who as a child watched her family die at the hands of the Galindo Cartel. She is the former leader of Los Olvidados (The Forgotten Ones), a group of Mexican rebels who are devoted to fighting the Galindo Cartel. She later starts a relationship with Angel and is the mother of their son Maverick.
 Richard Cabral as Johnny "El Coco" Cruz (seasons 1–4), a former Marine sniper and a full patch member of the Mayans M.C., Santo Padre Charter. He is the father of Leticia Cruz and the son of Celia. After being partially blinded in his right eye, he develops a severe painkiller addiction, which later progresses to heroin; ultimately leading to a brief ex-communication from the club. During this time he also starts a relationship with Hope, a fellow addict.
 Raoul Max Trujillo as Che "Taza" Romero, a former full patch member and Vice Presidente of the Mayans M.C., Santo Padre Charter. He was also a former member of the Vatos Malditos M.C. but left after its president, El Palo, killed his own brother David, with whom Taza was in a secret relationship. He later leaves Santo Padre, choosing to go Nomad.
 Antonio Jaramillo as Michael "Riz" Ariza (seasons 1–2), a Santo Padre local and Él Secretario of the Mayans M.C., Santo Padre Charter. He is also the nephew of Vicki Ariza.
 Danny Pino as Miguel Galindo, the leader of the Galindo Cartel, a Mexican drug cartel, who took over leadership following the death of his father, and cartel founder, Jose Galindo. He's the husband of Emily, the father of their son Cristóbal, the son of Jose's widow Dita Galindo and the biological son of Felipe Reyes.
 Edward James Olmos as Felipe Reyes, born Ignacio Cortina, a once-strong Mexican patriarch who owns a butcher shop in Santo Padre. He is the father of Angel and EZ through his deceased wife Marisol and is later revealed as the biological father of Miguel through his former lover, Dita.
 Emilio Rivera as Marcus Álvarez (season 2–present; recurring season 1), reprising his role from Sons of Anarchy as the former national Presidente, or El Padrino (The Godfather), of the Mayans M.C. and formerly of its Oakland Charter, the founding charter of the Mayans M.C. Prior to his departure, he chose three Kings to replace him to oversee the future of the club, including his cousin Bishop. He then served as the Galindo Cartel consejero, where he advised its leader Miguel but later abandons the cartel and returns to the Mayans as the new Presidente of the Santo Padre Charter. However, he is later voted out of the club by unanimous decision via a rule known as the "kill switch protocol".
 Sulem Calderon as Gabriela "Gaby" Castillo (season 3; guest seasons 2, 4), newly immigrated to the U.S. from Oaxaca, Mexico, she seeks to build a brighter future for herself and her family. After moving to Santo Padre, she starts a relationship with EZ until she leaves for Lodi to attend nursing school.
 Frankie Loyal as Hank "El Tranq" Loza (season 4; recurring seasons 1–3), a kind-hearted former bare-knuckle brawler and El Pacificador (Sgt-at-Arms) of the Mayans M.C., Santo Padre Charter.
 Joseph Raymond Lucero as Neron "Creeper" Vargas (season 4; recurring seasons 1–3), an ex-junkie from Los Angeles and Capitan Del Camino (Road Captain) of the Mayans M.C., Santo Padre Charter.
 Vincent Vargas as Gilberto "Gilly" Lopez (season 4; recurring seasons 1–3), a former U.S. Army Ranger and a good-natured mixed martial arts (MMA) fighter and a full patch member of the Mayans M.C., Santo Padre Charter.

Recurring
 Tony Plana as Devante Cano (season 1), the Galindo Cartel consejero who loyally served Jose Galindo and mentors his successor Miguel.
 Ada Maris as Dita Galindo (seasons 1–2; guest season 3), Miguel's mother and Jose's widow. She also has a history with Felipe Reyes, her former lover.
 Gino Vento as Nestor Oceteva, the head of security for the Galindo Cartel and a childhood friend of Miguel's who later becomes a prospect, sponsored by Marcus, for the Mayans M.C., Santo Padre Charter.
 Joe Ordaz as Paco (seasons 1–3), Miguel's personal driver and a member of the Galindo Cartel.
 Maurice Compte as Kevin Jimenez (season 1), a highly regarded DEA agent who makes it his personal mission to take down the Galindo Cartel.
 Curtiss Cook as Larry Bowen (season 1), a DEA agent who works with Kevin on taking down the Galindo Cartel.
 Salvador Chacón as Pablo (seasons 1–3), the second-in-command of Los Olvidados who serves as Adelita's right-hand man.
 Melony Ochoa as Mini (seasons 1–3), also known as "La Ratona" (The Mouse), a child member of Los Olvidados who has a close relationship with Adelita.
 Daniel Faraldo as Father Rodrigo (season 1), a Christian priest who preaches in Santo Padre and is an old friend of Felipe. He also has a history with Adelita's father, Pedro Espina.
 Alexandra Barreto as Antonia Pena (seasons 1–3), the mayor of Santo Padre and Katrina's wife. She is the former lover of Bishop and the mother of their deceased son, Aidan Losa.
 Michael Ornstein as Chuck "Chucky" Marstein (seasons 1–2), reprising his role from Sons of Anarchy, who now works at a junkyard in Santo Padre for the Mayans M.C. He is later stated to have moved to Ohio.
 Ada Luz Pla as Celia (season 1; guest season 3), Coco's manipulative mother who works as a prostitute and raised her granddaughter Leticia Cruz as her own.
 Emily Tosta as Leticia "Letty" Cruz, Coco's daughter who was raised by her grandmother Celia for most of her life believing she was his younger sister.
 Edwin Hodge as Franky Rogan (seasons 1–2; guest season 3), a police officer in the Santo Padre Police Department.
 Ray McKinnon as Lincoln "Linc" James Potter (seasons 1–2; guest seasons 3–4), reprising his role from Sons of Anarchy as the Assistant U.S. Attorney, now investigating both the Mayans M.C. and Los Olvidados.
 David Labrava as Happy Lowman (season 2; guest seasons 1, 3), reprising his role from Sons of Anarchy as the Sgt-at-Arms of SAMCRO (Sons of Anarchy Motorcycle Club, Redwood Originals), the founding charter of the Sons of Anarchy M.C and the former acting President of SAMDINO (Sons of Anarchy Motorcycle Club, San Bernardino Charter). He is later revealed to have killed Marisol Reyes as part of a murder-for-hire contract and also killed the son of Marcus Alvarez, Esai Alvarez, during a previous conflict with SAMCRO.
 Ivo Nandi as Oscar "El Oso" Ramos (seasons 2–3), reprising his role from Sons of Anarchy as the Presidente of the Mayans M.C., Stockton Charter and one of the three Kings of the Mayans M.C.
 Jimmy Gonzales as Canche (seasons 2–4), the Presidente of the Mayans M.C., Yuma Charter and one of the three Kings of the Mayans M.C.
 Mía Maestro as Sederica Palomo (seasons 2–3), the governor of Baja California who works with Miguel Galindo in secret.
 Efrat Dor as Anna Linares (seasons 2–3; guest season 4), a government agent working with Lincoln Potter in the investigation of the Mayans M.C. and Los Olvidados.
 Mikal Vega as Hobart (season 2), a mercenary squad leader hired by Lincoln Potter to destroy Los Olvidados.
 Malaya Rivera Drew as Ileana (season 2), an old friend of Emily now working for the Santo Padre city council.
 Mike Beltran as Ibarra (season 3; guest season 2), the Presidente of the Mayans M.C., Tucson Charter and a close ally of the Santo Padre charter.
 Vanessa Giselle as Hope (season 3–present; guest season 2), a heroin addict who starts a relationship with Coco and later becomes close friends with Leticia. She is also a former member of Isaac's drug community at Meth Mountain.
 Gregory Cruz as El Palo (season 3; guest season 2), El Unico (The One, aka President) of the Vatos Malditos Motorcycle Club, who make their money through human trafficking and recruit members without the prospecting process. He later patches over to the Mayans M.C., Yuma Charter. He is also the brother of Laura.
 Momo Rodriguez as Esteban "Steve" Estrada (season 3), a former prospect, sponsored by Hank, and later a full patch member of the Mayans M.C., Santo Padre Charter, who's dreamed of joining a M.C. his whole life.
 Justina Adorno as Stephanie (seasons 3–4), more commonly known as "Nails", one of the bartenders at the clubhouse of the Mayans M.C., Santo Padre Charter who has a recurring fling with Angel.
 Grace Rizzo as Jess (season 3–present), one of the bartenders at the clubhouse of the Mayans M.C., Santo Padre Charter who spies on the Mayans for SAMDINO. She is also Jazmine's sister.
 Holland Roden as Erin Thomas (season 3; guest season 4), Emily Galindo's younger sister, who moves to Santo Padre to live with her and reconnect.
 Patricia de Leon as Diana Alvarez (season 3–present), the wife of Marcus Alvarez who lives in Santo Padre with him and their children.
 JR Bourne as Isaac Packer (season 3; guest season 4), a full patch member of SAMDINO and former Nomad who became the leader of a drug community based outside of Santo Padre at an encampment dubbed "Meth Mountain" after he was ex-communicated from SAMDINO by his older brother, Les Packer, and became known by the moniker "the Devil" within the SOA.
 Spenser Granese as Butterfly (season 3), a drug dealer and member of Isaac's drug community at Meth Mountain.
 Natalia Cordova-Buckley as Laura (season 3), El Palo's sister, who is distant from him for killing their brother.
 Greg Vrotsos as Terry Drakos (season 4; guest season 3), the Vice President of SAMDINO who seeks to start a war with the Mayans.
 Guillermo García as Ignacio (season 4; guest season 3), more commonly known as "El Banquero" (The Banker), the unstable leader of Lobos Nueva Generación (LNG), a radical criminal organization made up of the remnants of the Lobos Sonora Cartel, who were previously defeated by the Galindo Cartel under Jose Galindo. He is also the brother of Soledad.
 Augie Duke as Treenie Gaeta (season 4; guest season 3), Tommy Gaeta's wife who later becomes a bartender at the clubhouse of the Mayans M.C., Santo Padre Charter and becomes close with Bishop.
 Manny Montana as Manny (season 4), an up-and-coming full patch member and later Vice Presidente of the Mayans M.C., Yuma Charter who befriends EZ.
 Andrea Cortés as Sofia (season 4), an employee at an animal shelter who helps EZ adopt a dog, Sally, and later starts a relationship with him.
 Stella Maeve as Katie (season 4), also known by the undercover alias "Kody", an ex-junkie who befriends Creeper at an NA meeting as part of a ruse whilst working as an undercover ATF agent.
 Greg Serano as Jay-Jay (season 4), an ex-convict who EZ was associated with whilst in prison.
 Selene Luna as Soledad (season 4), the leader of LNG and El Banquero's sister.
 Erica Luttrell as Rae (season 4), Gilly's former commanding officer in the U.S. Army Rangers, Paul's wife, and mother of their son Jacob.

Guests
 Robert Patrick as Les Packer (seasons 1–2), reprising his role from Sons of Anarchy as the President of SAMDINO until he is later forced to temporarily retire after being diagnosed with cancer. He is also the older brother of fellow SAMDINO member Isaac, who he previously ex-communicated from the club.
 Emiliano Torres as Dondo (seasons 1–4), the former Vice Presidente and later Presidente of the Mayans M.C., Stockton Charter.
 Peter Tuiasosopo as Afa Lefiti (season 1), the leader of the Basetown Tribe, a Samoan American street gang based in San Bernardino.
 Monica Estrada as Maria (seasons 1–3), a housekeeper who works for Miguel Galindo, often looking after his son Cristóbal and caring for his mother Dita.
 Katey Sagal as Gemma Teller Morrow (season 1), reprising her role from Sons of Anarchy during a flashback as the matriarch of SAMCRO.
 Noel G. as Louie, a member of the Dogwood Crew, a Mexican street gang based in Santo Padre.
 Diego Olmedo as Andres (season 1), a child member of Los Olvidados who acts as a mole for the Galindo Cartel.
 Elpidia Carrillo as Victoria "Vicki" Ariza (seasons 1–3), Riz's aunt and the owner of a discreet brothel outside Santo Padre which secretly hides a tunnel that goes under the Mexico-U.S. border.
 Rusty Coones as Rane Quinn (seasons 1–2), reprising his role from Sons of Anarchy as a full patch member of SAMCRO.
 Ray Nicholson as Hallorann (seasons 1–2), a prospect for SAMCRO who is sponsored by Happy.
 Wilson Ramirez as Solis (seasons 2–3), the Presidente of the Mayans M.C., Sahuarita Charter.
 Roel Navarro as Pavia (seasons 2–3), the Vice Presidente of the Mayans M.C., Tucson Charter.
 Loki as Lobo (season 2–present), the former El Pacificador of the Mayans M.C., Tucson Charter. He later patches over to the Sahuarita Charter and retains his position.
 Yvonne Valadez as Marisol Reyes (seasons 2–3), the deceased mother of Angel & EZ Reyes and the wife of Felipe Reyes. She was killed by Happy Lowman after a murder-for-hire contract was placed on her and Felipe by Dita Galindo out of jealousy. She only appears through flashbacks.
 John Pirruccello as O'Grady (seasons 2–3), a corrupt detective in the Stockton Police Department who works with the Mayans M.C., Stockton Charter.
 David Clayton Rogers as Marlon Buksar (season 2), a Sando Padre city clerk who actively works against Emily and her city projects.
 Kikéy Castillo as Dr. Luna (seasons 2–3), the therapist of Dita Galindo in Santo Padre.
 Michael Anthony Perez as Luis (season 2–present), a loyal sicario for the Galindo Cartel who often acts as extra muscle.
 Elizabeth Frances as Katrina (seasons 2–3), the wife of Santo Padre mayor Antonia Pena.
 Tommy Flanagan as Filip "Chibs" Telford (season 2), reprising his role from Sons of Anarchy as the President of SAMCRO.
 Jacob Vargas as Allesandro Montez (seasons 2–3), reprising his role from Sons of Anarchy as the Road Captain of SAMCRO who is also loosely affiliated with El Palo and the Vatos Malditos M.C. He is also the cousin of Tommy Montez, a fellow member of the SOA, and investigates his disappearance.
 Hector Verdugo as Otero (season 3–present), the former Vice Presidente and later Presidente of the Mayans M.C., Yuma Charter.
 Mia Danelle as Cielo (season 3–present), one of the bartenders at the clubhouse of the Mayans M.C., Santo Padre Charter.
 Joy Dai as Rosa (seasons 3–4), one of the bartenders at the clubhouse of the Mayans M.C., Santo Padre Charter.
 Denise G. Sanchez as Alicia (season 3), a single mother who works with the Mayans M.C., Santo Padre Charter to earn money.
 Judah Benjamin & Obadiah Abel as Cristóbal Galindo II (season 3–present), the young son of Miguel and Emily Galindo.
 Keong Sim as Juan Denver (season 3), a drug smuggler for the Galindo Cartel who listens to and quotes John Denver songs.
 Christian Vera as Sirena (season 3–present), a machete-wielding lieutenant of LNG loyal to Soledad.
 Alex Fernandez as Diaz (season 3–present), a founding member and Presidente of the Mayans M.C., Oakland Charter, taking over from Marcus Alvarez.
 Chad Guerrero as Tommy Gaeta (season 3), a full patch member of the Mayans M.C., Stockton Charter.
 Fabian Alomar as Rooster (season 3–present), the Presidente of the Mayans M.C., Portland Charter.
 Angel Oquendo as Downer (season 4), a full patch member of the Mayans M.C., Yuma Charter.
 Julio Cesar Ruiz as Tex (season 4), a full patch member of the Mayans M.C., Oakland Charter.
 Bruce Robert Cole as Thomas "Doc" Harper (season 4), the acting President of SAMDINO, who takes over from Les Packer after he's diagnosed with cancer.
 Dakota Daulby as Joker (season 4), a full patch member of SAMDINO.
 Zhaleh Vossough as Jazmine (season 4), Jess' sister and Terry's girlfriend.
 Lex Medlin as Randall (season 4), an accountant who handles the finances of LNG and is on the run from the U.S. government.
 Renée Victor as Sister Teresa (season 4), Miguel's maternal aunt who lives in a secluded convent in Mexico.
 CM Punk as Paul (season 4), a former U.S. Army Ranger and close friend of Gilly who suffers from suicidal thoughts, Rae's husband and Jacob's father.
 Presciliana Esparolini as Maggie (season 4), Diana's friend who is set up with Bishop.
 Kim Coates as Alexander "Tig" Trager (season 4), reprising his role from Sons of Anarchy as the Vice President of SAMCRO.

Mayans hierarchy

Episodes

Season 1 (2018)

Season 2 (2019)

Season 3 (2021)

Season 4 (2022)

Production

Development
On May 11, 2016, it was announced that FX had begun formal script development on a spinoff of the television series Sons of Anarchy. The long-rumored offshoot, entitled Mayans M.C., was created by Kurt Sutter and Elgin James, with James writing the pilot script and both executive producing. Production companies announced as being involved with the series included Fox 21 Television Studios and FX Productions. On December 1, 2016, FX officially gave the production a pilot order. It was also announced that Sutter would direct the series' pilot episode.

On July 5, 2017, it was announced that the pilot would be undergoing reshoots and that Norberto Barba would be replacing Sutter as director of the episode as Sutter planned to exclusively focus on the writing of the episode. Additionally, it was reported that various roles would be recast and that Barba would also be serving as an executive producer.

On January 5, 2018, FX announced at the annual Television Critics Association's winter press tour that the production had been given a series order for a first season consisting of ten episodes. On June 28, 2018, it was reported that the series would premiere on September 4, 2018. On October 1, 2018, it was announced that FX had renewed the series for a second season which premiered on September 3, 2019. On November 4, 2019, FX renewed the series for a third season which premiered on March 16, 2021. On May 3, 2021, FX renewed the series for a fourth season which premiered on April 19, 2022. On July 24, 2022, FX renewed the series for a fifth season. On January 12, 2023, FX announced that the fifth season would be its last.

Casting
In February 2017, it was announced that Edward James Olmos, John Ortiz, J. D. Pardo, and Antonio Jaramillo had been cast in lead roles in the pilot. In March 2017, it was reported that Richard Cabral, Sarah Bolger, Jacqueline Obradors, and Andrea Londo had also been cast. In October 2017, it was announced that Michael Irby and Raoul Trujillo had been cast in series regular roles. In November 2016, it was reported that Emilio Rivera would be reprising his role of Marcus Álvarez from Sons of Anarchy in the series. On April 25, 2017, it was announced that Carla Baratta would be replacing Andrea Londo in the role of Adelita. Additionally, it was reported that Maurice Compte had been cast in a potentially recurring role. On May 1, 2017, it was reported that Efrat Dor would joining the cast in a potentially recurring capacity. In October 2017, it was announced that Danny Pino and Vincent Vargas had been cast in the pilot with Pino in a starring role. In April 2018, it was announced that Gino Vento and Tony Plana had been cast in recurring roles. On July 22, 2018, Sutter revealed in an interview with Deadline Hollywood that Ortiz had been replaced by Michael Irby.

Filming
Principal photography for the pilot episode was expected to begin in March 2017. In July 2017, it was reported that the pilot would undergo reshoots that would take place in late summer 2017. Those reshoots reportedly began during the week of October 23, 2017, in Los Angeles.

Release

Premiere
On June 8, 2018, the series held an official world premiere sneak peek at the annual ATX Television Festival in Austin, Texas. Co-creators Kurt Sutter and Elgin James, executive producer/director Norberto Barba, and cast members took part in the Republic of Texas Motorcycle Rally in downtown Austin. This was followed by a screening of an exclusive clip from the show and a question-and-answer panel at the Paramount Theatre with guests including producers Sutter, James, and Barba as well cast members such as J. D. Pardo, Clayton Cardenas, Sarah Bolger, Carla Baratta, Richard Cabral, Antonio Jaramillo, Emilio Rivera, Danny Pino, Michael Irby, Vincent Vargas, Raoul Trujillo, and Frankie Loyal.

On July 22, 2018, the series held a panel at San Diego Comic-Con in Hall H of the San Diego Convention Center in San Diego, California. The panel was moderated by Entertainment Weeklys Lynnette Rice and included creators Sutter and James as well as cast member J.D. Pardo. The panel also included a screening of the first thirteen minutes of the pilot episode.

On August 28, 2018, the series held its official premiere at the Grauman's Chinese Theatre in Los Angeles, California. Those in attendance included J.D. Pardo, Edward James Olmos, Sarah Bolger, Michael Irby, Clayton Cardenas, Kurt Sutter, Katey Sagal, Raoul Max Trujillo, Danny Pino, Antonio Jaramillo, Richard Cabral, Maurice Compte, Carla Baratta, Emilio Rivera, and Yadi Valeria.

Distribution
As of 2018, Mayans M.C. is airing in the following countries and channels:
The series premiered on September 4, 2018, on FoxPremium in South America and FXNow in Canada. It premiered on September 5, 2018, on Fox Showcase in Australia, Canal+ in France, Neon in New Zealand, and HBO in Denmark, Norway, Spain, Finland and Sweden. In 2019, it was made available in the UK by BBC iPlayer.

Reception

Critical response

On the review aggregation website Rotten Tomatoes, the first season holds a 72% approval rating with an average rating of 6.43 out of 10 based on 36 reviews. The website's critical consensus reads, "Mayans M.C. is a thrilling drama with compelling characters, but it struggles to find its pace and the Tellers are hard to forget." On Metacritic, the season has a score of 57 out of 100, based on 19 critics, indicating "mixed or average reviews".

The second season has a 100% approval rating on Rotten Tomatoes, with an average rating of  7.75 out of 10 based on 5 reviews.

Ratings

Accolades

Notes

References

External links
 
 

2010s American crime drama television series
2018 American television series debuts
2020s American crime drama television series
English-language television shows
Gangs in fiction
Sons of Anarchy
FX Networks original programming
American television spin-offs
Mexican television series
Mexico–United States border
Television shows set in California
Television series by Touchstone Television
Television series by 20th Century Fox Television
Television series about organized crime
Hispanic and Latino American television
Works about gangs
Works about Mexican drug cartels
Works about organized crime in the United States
Works about outlaw motorcycle clubs
Television series created by Kurt Sutter